Kirill Olegovich Kaprizov (born 26 April 1997) is a Russian professional ice hockey left winger for the Minnesota Wild of the National Hockey League (NHL). Before joining the Wild, Kaprizov played for Metallurg Novokuznetsk, Salavat Yulaev Ufa and CSKA Moscow in the Kontinental Hockey League (KHL). Kaprizov won the Calder Memorial Trophy as NHL rookie of the year in 2021, becoming the first Wild player to win the award. He is known to fans by the nickname “Dolla Dolla Bill” and "Kirill the Thrill".

Early life
Kaprizov grew up in a small village about 60 miles (96.56 kilometers) outside Novokuznetsk, Russia. He began playing hockey at age four, traveling daily between his village and downtown Novokuzentsk for practice, before eventually moving to the city to further his hockey career. Kaprizov played in the Metallurg Novokuznetsk hockey school from a young age, progressing to the Kuznetskie Medvedi junior team before beginning his professional career with the senior team in 2014.

Playing career

KHL career (2014–2020)

Kaprizov made his Kontinental Hockey League (KHL) debut playing with his hometown club, Metallurg Novokuznetsk, during the 2014–15 KHL season, after being drafted first overall in the 2014 KHL Junior Draft. On 21 August 2015, Kaprizov was signed to a three-year contract extension to remain with Metallurg Novokuznetsk.

On 2 May 2016, he was traded to Salavat Yulaev Ufa. He would play one season for Ufa, totaling 42 points in 49 games before being traded to CSKA Moscow in 2017 in exchange for monetary compensation. He played in the 2018 and 2019 Gagarin Cup finals, winning the latter. 

During his final season under contract with CSKA in 2019–20, Kaprizov set career-high marks with 33 goals (ranked 1 in the KHL), 29 assists, and 62 points (ranked 3 in the KHL) and tied his career best in games-played with 57. He registered his 100th career goal on 15 October 2019, becoming the youngest player in KHL history to do so, at 22 years, 172 days old. In the postseason, Kaprizov posted four points in CSKA's first-round series sweep against Torpedo Nizhny Novgorod before the KHL cancelled its season due to the COVID-19 pandemic. However, he and the rest of CSKA team were awarded the title of KHL champions based on regular standings. During his KHL career, Kaprizov was selected to five KHL All-Star Games in each year from 2016 to 2020.

Minnesota Wild (2021–present)
Kaprizov was drafted by the Minnesota Wild of the National Hockey League in the fifth round of the 2015 NHL Entry Draft, 135th overall. According to Wild owner Craig Leipold, the Wild's scouting department only became aware of Kaprizov when smog from the 2014 California wildfires delayed their flight home from a scouting trip in Russia. This allowed them to attend one of Kaprizov's games for Metallurg Novokuznetsk. Upon being drafted by the Wild, Kaprizov learned about Minnesota from his Novokuznetsk teammate and Minnesota native Ryan Stoa. He has credited Stoa with helping him to learn English to prepare for his career in the NHL.

Early career: Calder Trophy, contract extension, and franchise records
On 13 July 2020, Kaprizov signed a two-year, entry-level deal with the Minnesota Wild. The contract would include the 2019–20 season, which was impacted by the COVID-19 pandemic, but he did not play his first game until the 2020–21 season. Kaprizov made his NHL debut on 14 January 2021 against the Los Angeles Kings. He tallied three points, including the game-winning goal in overtime, in a 4–3 victory for the Wild. In this game, he became the first player in NHL history to score three points and an overtime goal in his debut, and became the third player in NHL history to score an overtime goal in his debut. He was subsequently named NHL First Star of the Week for the week ending 17 January. Kaprizov scored his first NHL hat trick on 12 March, in a 4–0 victory over the Arizona Coyotes. On 19 April, Kaprizov scored his 37th point, breaking the Wild's franchise record for points by a rookie, which was previously held by Marián Gáborík (in 2000–01). Despite the shortened 2020–21 NHL season as a result of the COVID-19 pandemic, Kaprizov set Wild franchise records for goals and points by a rookie, with 27 goals and 51 points. He would eventually be awarded the Calder Memorial Trophy as rookie of the year, becoming the first player in Wild franchise history to receive the honor. He received 99 out of 100 first place votes, the highest percentage since Teemu Selänne in 1993.

On 21 September 2021, Kaprizov signed a five-year, $45 million contract with the Wild. The contract came after months of negotiations in which Kaprizov was reported to be willing to return to CSKA Moscow if did not come to terms with the Wild. Regarding these reports, Kaprizov said there was "no chance" he would have returned to the KHL. Upon signing the contract, Kaprizov became the highest-paid sophomore player in NHL history. After starting the season with 40 points in 32 games, Kaprizov was selected for his first NHL All-Star Game. At All-Star weekend, he participated in the Breakaway Challenge in the NHL All-Star Skills Competition with a tribute to Alexander Ovechkin, wearing Ovechkin's jersey and performing his famed "hot stick" celebration. On 2 April 2022, Kaprizov broke Marián Gáborík's franchise record for points in a season, with 84. Later that month, he would go on to break Gáborík's franchise record for goals in a season, with 43. By the season's end, Kaprizov had set Wild franchise records in each of the major scoring categories with 47 goals, 61 assists, and 108 points.

During the 2022 off-season, Kaprizov returned to Russia to visit family, despite Wild general manager Bill Guerin encouraging him to stay in Minnesota due to the ongoing Russo-Ukrainian War. In July 2022, multiple Russian media outlets reported that Kaprizov was wanted in Russia for allegedly purchasing a fraudulent military identity card in 2017 to evade the mandatory military service required of Russian men aged 18 to 27. The reports occurred days after Philadelphia Flyers prospect Ivan Fedotov was arrested in Russia for purchasing a military ID in 2017. Kaprizov and Fedotov were teammates on Salavat Yulaev Ufa during this time. Responding to these reports, Kaprizov's father denied the allegations and stated that Kaprizov was a student at the Russian Presidential Academy of National Economy and Public Administration, and thus his military obligations were delayed as a result of his studies. Despite the reports being largely refuted by Western media, Kaprizov unsuccessfully attempted to go to the United States twice in the days following, first via Dubai and then via the Caribbean. He returned to Russia after these attempts. On 1 August, Kaprizov successfully entered the United States via Turkey, arriving in New York City before returning to Minnesota the following day.

International play

Kaprizov has played for the Russian national team in the IIHF World U18 Championship, IIHF World Junior Championship, senior Ice Hockey World Championships, and the Winter Olympics. 

At the 2017 World Junior Championship, Kaprizov tied for leading scorer with nine goals and three assists in 12 games. In this tournament, Russia won bronze, beating Finland in the third place game. 

He was the youngest player on the gold medal-winning Olympic Athletes from Russia team at the 2018 Winter Olympics. Kaprizov scored the golden goal in overtime of the final match against Germany, winning the first gold medal for the Russian ice hockey team since 1992. His five goals throughout the Olympics finished tied for the tournament lead. 

In 2019, he won bronze at the 2019 IIHF World Championship.

Personal life
Kaprizov is a Russian Orthodox Christian. He is the godfather and namesake of his CSKA Moscow teammate Nikita Nesterov's son, Kirill Nesterov, who was baptized in the Russian Orthodox Church in 2019.

Kaprizov enjoys playing video games, including games from the Toon Town, Counter Strike and Dota franchises. When back home in Novokuznetsk, he enjoys fishing and playing football.

Career statistics

Regular season and playoffs

International

Awards and honors

Minnesota Wild records

References

External links
 

1997 births
Calder Trophy winners
HC CSKA Moscow players
Ice hockey players at the 2018 Winter Olympics
Kuznetskie Medvedi players
Living people
Medalists at the 2018 Winter Olympics
Metallurg Novokuznetsk players
Minnesota Wild draft picks
Minnesota Wild players
Olympic gold medalists for Olympic Athletes from Russia
Olympic ice hockey players of Russia
Olympic medalists in ice hockey
People from Novokuznetsk
Russian ice hockey left wingers
Salavat Yulaev Ufa players
Sportspeople from Kemerovo Oblast